Murden is a surname. Notable people with the surname include:

Kristle Murden (born 1956), American singer-songwriter, musician, music producer, vocal coach and ordained minister
Richard Murden (1906–1997), Australian politician 
Tori Murden (born 1963), American athlete and university administrator